The millennial pause is a barely perceptible pause that is present at the start of some recorded videos, especially on short-form video app TikTok.  The practice of including such a pause is generally ascribed to millennials, a group often defined to include people born in the 1980s or 1990s.  The phenomenon is an example of the digital generation gap between millennials and younger generations.

Observation 

Kathryn Lindsay of The Atlantic, a millennial herself, stated that this pause is becoming more noticeable as short-form videos are becoming more prevalent on social network Instagram, instant messaging app Snapchat, and online video platform YouTube.

Videos by people other than millennials have also been described as exhibiting a millennial pause; Parade reported that singer JC Chasez included one in his TikTok debut video, and James Factora of Them mentioned how actress Jennifer Coolidge included one in "a perfect TikTok" during her debut.

Theory 

It has been conjectured that the reason why people older than zoomers tend to include a pause at the start of their videos is to make sure that the device they are using is actually recording before beginning to say anything.  In contrast, younger users are said to trust that the devices are working correctly, and begin speaking immediately after the recording begins.

Another theory for the pause's prevalence is that the habit may have first been adopted when earlier recording devices commonly took a split second before beginning to record.  Although newer devices do not exhibit the same delay, this habit has proven hard to break.

Awareness 

Becoming aware of the phenomenon has made some millennials notice that they are "getting old".  People have also noted that, once they have been made aware that their recordings include millennial pauses, they find their own habit embarrassing, but also have trouble breaking the habit.  Some people have stated that, without the pause, the start of their dialogue would be cut off.  Users have also stated that, once one is aware of the phenomenon, it is difficult to ignore its presence in a video.

The phrase has been used untranslated outside of the Anglosphere, including in Brazil, Chile, Denmark, France, Germany, Indonesia, Italy, Mexico, the Netherlands, and Spain.

Millennials online 

The millennial pause is considered a part of what Lindsay called the "Millennial Internet Era", which also includes social networks Facebook and Instagram, and GIF files used as reactions.  20 minutes also mentions instant messaging client MSN Messenger and social networks MySpace, Skyblog, and Tumblr as part of the formative online experience of millennials, noting that these outlets did not specialize in videos.

When discussing the millennial pause, Junkee also mentioned other online habits often associated with millennials, such as using the word "doggo" or "adulting", applying filters, or zooming in to emphasize a point.  The Cut also mentioned a number of other "cheugy" online behaviors, such as using the phrase "I did a thing" or "so that just happened"; being a fan of Supernatural, Doctor Who, or Sherlock; or using a pizza or taco emoji in a profile on the dating app Tinder.  The Toronto Star also mentioned using Boomerang or posting photos taken in landscape orientation on Instagram as similarly awkward millennial practices.

One zoomer, whose impressions of millennials are popular on social media, described the online behavior of millennials as "basically a bunch of silly little nuances strung together to create a personality that is very giddy and excitable about the normal or mundane".

Gen Z shake 

On , a Gen Z user of TikTok posted a video describing how members of Generation Z often start recording their videos right before placing their cameras on a stable surface.  As a result, the video shakes at the start of these recordings before the camera is set down.  The user dubbed the behavior the "Gen Z shake", and called it "the Gen Z equivalent to the millennial pause".

Lindsay reported that she has also found videos that begin while the recorder is in the middle of a task, such as finishing a bite of food, so that it may take some time before the recorder actually addresses the audience.  She stated that, like the Gen Z shake, doing this gives the audience the sense that the video begins in medias res.  Lindsay added that the Gen Z shake is "a performance" rather than an unconscious act, and points out that although this phenomenon, like the millennial pause, could be edited out, neither is.  Another social media content creator has theorized that, because zoomers live their entire lives online, the Gen Z shake is an act of rebellion, and is done ironically.

See also 
 Digital literacy

Notes

References

External links 
 

2020s in Internet culture
Cultural generations
Social media
Video